The alpha-3 beta-4 nicotinic receptor, also known as the α3β4 receptor and the ganglion-type nicotinic receptor, is a type of nicotinic acetylcholine receptor, consisting of α3 and β4 subunits. It is located in the autonomic ganglia and adrenal medulla, where activation yields post- and/or presynaptic excitation, mainly by increased Na+ and K+ permeability.

As with other nicotinic acetylcholine receptors, the α3β4 receptor is pentameric [(α3)m(β4)n where m + n = 5]. The exact subunit stoichiometry is not known and it is possible that more than one functional α3β4 receptor assembles in vivo with varying subunit stoichiometries.

Ligands which inhibit the α3β4 receptor have been shown to modulate drug-seeking behavior, making α3β4 a promising target for the development of novel antiaddictive agents.

Ligands

Agonists 
 Acetylcholine (endogenous neurotransmitter that binds non-selectively to nAChRs and mAChRs)
 Anabaseine and other structural analogs
 Carbachol
 Cytisine (partial agonist) 
 Dimethylphenylpiperazinium
 Epibatidine
 Lobeline
 Nicotine
 RJR-2429

Antagonists

Competitive 

 DHβE
 SR 16584, highly selective over α4β2 and α7

Noncompetitive 
 Dextromethorphan
 Dextrorphan
 Dextropropoxyphene
 Hexamethonium
 Imipramine
 Levacetylmethadol
 Mecamylamine
 Methadone
 Tubocurarine
Bupropion
Reboxetine
Ibogaine
Voacangine
18-MC
18-MAC
ME-18-MC
AT-1001
Choline

See also 
 α3β2-Nicotinic receptor
 α4β2-Nicotinic receptor
 α7-Nicotinic receptor
 Muscle-type nicotinic receptor

References 

Ion channels
Nicotinic acetylcholine receptors